The United States was engaged in a war in Afghanistan following the September 11, 2001 attacks from October 7, 2001 to August 30, 2021 as a part of the war on terror. Participants in the initial American operation, Operation Enduring Freedom, included a NATO coalition whose initial goals were to train the Afghan National Security Forces (ANSF) and assist Afghanistan in rebuilding key government institutions after the fall of the Taliban regime in December 2001. However, coalition forces were gradually involved in the broader war as well, as Taliban resistance continued until 2021, when they regained control of the country and formed a new government. This is a list of known code names and related information for military operations associated with the war, including operations to airlift citizens of coalition countries and at-risk Afghan civilians from Afghanistan as the war drew to a close.

Background

From May 1996, Osama bin Laden had been living in Afghanistan along with other members of al-Qaeda, operating terrorist training camps in a loose alliance with the Taliban. Following the 1998 US embassy bombings in Africa, the US military launched cruise missiles at these camps with limited effect on their overall operations. A follow-on plan, Operation Infinite Resolve, was planned but not implemented. The UN Security Council issued Resolutions 1267 and 1333 in 1999 and 2000, respectively, applying financial and military hardware sanctions to encourage the Taliban to turn over bin Laden to appropriate authorities for trial in the embassy bombings, as well as to close terrorist training camps.

After the September 11, 2001, attacks, investigators rapidly accumulated evidence implicating bin Laden. In a taped statement released in 2004, bin Laden publicly acknowledged his and al-Qaeda's direct involvement in the attacks. In an audiotape posted on a website that the US claims is "frequently used by al-Qaeda," on May 21, 2006, bin Laden said that he had personally directed the 19 hijackers.

2001: War begins

The war in Afghanistan began on October 7, 2001, as Operation Enduring Freedom, in response to the 9/11 attacks. This conflict marked the beginning of the US war on terror. The stated purpose of the invasion was to capture Osama bin Laden, destroy al-Qaeda, and remove the Taliban regime, which had provided them support and safe harbor. In December, the Taliban government fell and a transitional government was established.

Coalition operations
Operation Crescent Wind
Operation Relentless Strike
Operation Rhino

Battles
Fall of Mazar-i-Sharif
Siege of Kunduz
Fall of Kabul (2001)
2001 uprising in Herat
Battle of Tarin Kowt
Fall of Kandahar
Battle of Qala-i-Jangi
Battle of Tora Bora

2002 operations

Coalition operations
Operation Anaconda (includes Operation Harpoon, and the Battle of Takur Ghar)
 Operation Glock
 Operation Polar Harpoon
Operation Jacana
 Operation Ptarmigan
 Operation Snipe
 Operation Condor
 Operation Buzzard
Operation Mountain Lion
Operation Mountain Sweep

Insurgent attacks
Kabul

2003 operations
Operation Mongoose
Operation Tsunami
Operation Eagle Fury
Operation Haven Denial
Operation Athena
Operation Warrior Sweep
Operation Mountain Resolve
Operation Mountain Viper
Operation Avalanche
Operation Headstrong

2004 operations

Operation Asbury Park
Operation Asbury Park II
Operation Flashman
Operation Headstrong
Operation Lightning Resolve
Operation Mountain Blizzard
Operation Mountain Storm

2005 operations
Operation Archer
Operation Argus
Operation Spurs
Operation Mavericks
Operation Celtics
Operation Red Wings
 Operation Red Wings II
 Operation Whalers

2006 operations

In January 2006, NATO's focus in southern Afghanistan was to form Provincial Reconstruction Teams with the British leading in Helmand Province and the Netherlands and Canada leading similar deployments in Orūzgān Province and Kandahar Province, respectively. The Americans remained in control of Zabul Province. Local Taliban figures voiced opposition to the incoming force and pledged to resist it.

Battles
Battle of Lashkagar
Battle of Panjwaii
Siege of Sangin
Battle of Nawzad
 Operation Cobra Strike

2007 operations

US and NATO ISAF operations, alongside Afghan National Army forces, continued against the Taliban in 2007. Significant military operations in 2007 included operations around Sangin, Operation Achilles, the Battle of Chora, Operation Harekate Yolo and the Battle of Musa Qala, among others.

Insurgent attacks
Operation Kamin
Operation Nasrat
Bagram Air Base
Baghlan

Battles
Battle of Musa Qala
Battle of Chora
Battle of Firebase Anaconda

2008 operations

Significant military operations in 2008 included the Helmand province campaign, Operation Karez, and Operation Eagle's Summit, among others.

Coalition operations

Operation Sohil Laram III during March and April around Hutal
Operation Sur Kor (Red House) during April in Zari District
Operation Karez during May in Badghis Province
Operation Oqab Sterga (Eagle's Eye) during May around Grishk
Operation Janub Zilzila (Southern Edge) during June in Mizan District, Zabul Province
Operation Eagle's Summit (Oqab Tsuka) during August and September in Kandahar and Helmand Provinces
Operation Sond Chara (Red Dagger) during December in Helmand Province

Insurgent attacks
Hotel Serena
Kandahar
Indian Embassy
Uzbin Valley ambush
Balamorghab ambush
Sarposa Prison attack
Spin Boldak bombing

Battles
Battle of Arghandab
Battle of Garmsir
Gora Prai airstrike
Battle of Shewan
Battle of Shok Valley
Battle of Wanat

2009 operations

Coalition operations
Counterinsurgency in Northern Afghanistan
Operation Aabi Toorah (Blue Sword) 2C
 Operation Tor Tapus 2
Operation Cobra's Anger
Operation Diesel
Operation Khanjar (Strike of the Sword)
Operation Oqab (Eagle)
Operation Panchai Palang (Panther's Claw)
Operation Sarack (May)
Operation Shahi Tandar

Insurgent attacks
Kabul raid
Kandahar
Indian Embassy
UN guest house
Camp Chapman attack

Battles
Battle of Dahaneh
Battle of Alasay (Operation Dinner Out)
Battle of COP Keating
Battle of Ganjgal

2010 operations

Coalition operations
Operation Dragon Strike
Operation Moshtarak (Battle of Marja)
Operation Tor Shezada
Operation Hamkari
Operation Mountain Reach II (Battle of Daridam)

2011 operations

2012 operations

2013 operations

2014 operations

2015 operations

2016 operations

2017 operations

2018 operations

2019 operations

2020 operations

2021 operations

List of battles and operations

The following table lists known military operations of the war in Afghanistan (2001–2021).

See also

British Forces casualties in Afghanistan since 2001
Canadian Forces casualties in Afghanistan
Civilian casualties in the war in Afghanistan (2001–2021)
Coalition casualties in Afghanistan
Helmand Province campaign
International Security Assistance Force
Taliban insurgency
U.S. government response to the September 11 attacks
War in Afghanistan (2001–2021)

References

Further reading

External links
10th Mountain passes torch to 82nd Airborne
Details of ISAF and PRT deployments in Afghanistan - 2006
Australian Defence Force - Operation Slipper
British Operations in Afghanistan
Canadian Forces Operations in Afghanistan
Dutch deployment to Afghanistan
Romanian operations in Afghanistan

 
Operations
Military operations in Afghanistan
Wars involving the Taliban
2000s in Afghanistan
2010s in Afghanistan
Articles containing video clips